Trausti Eyjólfsson (22 November 1927 – 20 July 2010) was an Icelandic sprinter. He competed in the men's 4 × 100 metres relay at the 1948 Summer Olympics.

References

1927 births
2010 deaths
Athletes (track and field) at the 1948 Summer Olympics
Trausti Eyjolfsson
Trausti Eyjolfsson
Place of birth missing